The Tsaganomyidae are an extinct family of rodents from Asia. It contains three genera.  Tsaganomyids are generally considered to be related to the Hystricognathi (porcupines and relatives). Members of Tsaganomyidae were fossorial (digging) rodents that probably used their incisor teeth to dig like some living mole rats.

Characteristics
Tsaganomyids had a protrogomorphous zygomasseteric system, a hystricognathous lower jaw, and multiserial enamel in their incisor teeth.

References

Prehistoric rodent families
Rupelian first appearances
Miocene extinctions